"Neo-Hindu" refers to Hinduism-inspired new religious movements,
 in India, see 
Hindu revivalism 
 Neo-Vedanta
 in the West, see Hinduism in the West

See also
Hindu denominations#Newer movements
List of new religious movements
Hindutva
Sanatani